Loudon is a census-designated place (CDP) and the main village in the town of Loudon in Merrimack County, New Hampshire, United States. The population of the CDP was 711 at the 2020 census, out of 5,576 in the entire town.

Geography
The CDP is in the southern part of the town of Loudon, on both sides of the Soucook River. The northern boundary of the CDP is north of School Street, Church Street, and New Hampshire Route 129, and follows Wiggins Road to the northeast corner of the CDP. To the east, all houses on East Cooper Street, Hemlock Hill Drive, Ilona Lane, and Brown Lane are within the CDP. The border extends south along New Hampshire Route 106 to Wales Bridge over the Soucook River, then turns northwest up Riverview Lane and Pine Island Brook until back to the northwest corner of the CDP.

Route 106 passes through the east side of the CDP, leading north  to Laconia and south  to U.S. Route 3 in Pembroke. Concord, the state capital, is eight miles to the southwest via Route 106 and Interstate 393. Route 129 leads northeast from Loudon  to New Hampshire Route 107 in the southern part of Gilmanton.

The Soucook River, which flows southward through the center of the community, is part of the Merrimack River watershed.

Demographics

As of the census of 2010, there were 559 people, 233 households, and 147 families residing in the CDP. There were 256 housing units, of which 23, or 9.0%, were vacant. The racial makeup of the CDP was 97.5% white, 0.2% African American, 0.2% Native American, 0.5% Asian, 0.0% Pacific Islander, 0.2% some other race, and 1.4% from two or more races. 0.9% of the population were Hispanic or Latino of any race.

Of the 233 households in the CDP, 27.0% had children under the age of 18 living with them, 54.9% were headed by married couples living together, 5.2% had a female householder with no husband present, and 36.9% were non-families. 31.3% of all households were made up of individuals, and 20.2% were someone living alone who was 65 years of age or older. The average household size was 2.40, and the average family size was 2.96.

20.9% of residents in the CDP were under the age of 18, 6.0% were from age 18 to 24, 21.3% were from 25 to 44, 30.9% were from 45 to 64, and 20.9% were 65 years of age or older. The median age was 46.1 years. For every 100 females, there were 91.4 males. For every 100 females age 18 and over, there were 85.7 males.

For the period 2011-15, the estimated median annual income for a household was $64,625, and the median income for a family was $65,313. The per capita income for the CDP was $33,566.

References

Census-designated places in New Hampshire
Census-designated places in Merrimack County, New Hampshire